Bogolyubovo is a rural locality (a settlement) in Suzdalsky District of Vladimir Oblast, Russia, located some  northeast of Vladimir, the administrative center of the oblast. Population:     3,900 (1969).

History
It was built between 1158 and 1165 by the order of Andrey Bogolyubsky at the mouth of the Nerl River (where it flows into the Klyazma River). Russian Orthodox Christians believe that Bogolyubovo was founded on the spot where Bogolyubsky saw a miraculous vision of the Theotokos, who commanded him to build a church and a monastery on this spot. Consequently, the Church of the Intercession on the Nerl was built here.  The church has been on UNESCO World Heritage List since 1992.

Bogolyubsky also commissioned the icon of the apparition of the Theotokos. This icon has been known as the Bogolubskaya Icon of the Theotokos.

After Bogolyubsky's death, Bogolyubovo was ravaged and ransacked by Gleb of Ryazan in 1177. In the 1230s, the Mongols destroyed its fortifications.

In 1960–2006, Bogolyubovo had urban-type settlement status.

References

External links

 Main sights in Bogolyubovo
Information about the Bogolyubovo Monastery

Rural localities in Suzdalsky District
Vladimirsky Uyezd
Golden Ring of Russia